Revolution! is the seventh studio album by American rock band Paul Revere & the Raiders, on Columbia Records (CS 9521). Produced by Terry Melcher and released in 1967, it reached number 25 on the U.S. albums chart and yielded two top 40 singles. The album cover photo was taken on the porch of a house located at the corner of East 15th Street and Mississippi Avenue in Joplin, Missouri.

Release and reception

Revolution! featured such session musicians as Ry Cooder, Van Dyke Parks, Hal Blaine and Glen Campbell. 
It peaked at number 25 on the Billboard 200 albums chart. 
In a 1967 review, Billboard called the album a "driving package" that should continue the band's "successful chart string." The tracks "Him or Me – What's It Gonna Be?", "I Had a Dream", "Mo'reen", "Tighter" and "Gone - Movin' On" were named album highlights. 
Allmusic's Jack Rabid wrote: "If not as consistently a knockout as Spirit of '67, Revolution! is nevertheless right on its heels, containing as it does an even greater degree of pop experimentation within the form." Rabid described singer and songwriter Mark Lindsay as a "minor marvel" and "the glue that holds what would have been a willy-nilly collection together."

This album was remastered and rereleased by Sundazed Records on November 19, 1996 with bonus tracks.

Original track listing

All songs written by Mark Lindsay and Terry Melcher.

Side 1
 "Him or Me – What's It Gonna Be?" — 2:50
 "Reno" — 2:24
 "Upon Your Leaving" — 3:12
 "Mo'reen" — 2:30
 "Wanting You"  — 2:52
 "Gone - Movin' On" — 2:34

Side 2
 "I Had a Dream" — 2:20
 "Tighter" — 1:59
 "Make It with Me" — 3:07
 "Ain't Nobody Who Can Do It Like Leslie Can" — 2:19
 "I Hear a Voice" — 2:49

Sundazed Records 1996 version
 "Him or Me – What's It Gonna Be?" — 2:50
 "Reno" — 2:24
 "Upon Your Leaving" — 3:12
 "Mo'reen" — 2:30
 "Wanting You"  — 2:52
 "Gone - Movin' On" — 2:34
 "I Had a Dream" (Isaac Hayes, Lindsay, Melcher, David Porter) — 2:20
 "Tighter"  — 1:59
 "Make It With Me" — 3:07
 "Ain't Nobody Who Can Do It Like Leslie Can" — 2:19
 "I Hear a Voice" — 2:49
 "Ups and Downs" — 2:49  (Bonus track)
 "Try Some of Mine" — 2:45  (Bonus track)
 "Legend of Paul Revere" — 3:49  (Bonus track)

Chart performance

Personnel
Paul Revere - keyboards
Mark Lindsay - vocals, saxophone
Mike "Smitty" Smith - drums
Charlie Coe - bass guitar
Drake "Kid" Levin - lead guitar
Phil "Fang" Volk - bass guitar
Jim "Harpo" Valley - lead guitar
Freddy Weller - lead guitar
Joe Correro, Jr. - drums

References

1967 albums
Columbia Records albums
Parlophone albums
Albums produced by Terry Melcher
Paul Revere & the Raiders albums